Bahra tayegu or bahra chuyegu (Nepal Bhasa: बराह तयेगु or बराह चुयेगु ) is a coming of age ritual in the Newar community of Nepal in which girls between the ages of 7 to 13 are married to the sun god in a 12-day ceremony. Bahra tayegu is a second marriage of a Newari girl. The first one is ihi- the marriage with god vishnu . In Nepal Bhasa bahra means a 'cave' and teyegu or chuyegu mean 'to put', thus Bahra tayegu is the ceremony where Newar girls are put in a "cave" for 12 days. For the first 11 days the girl is kept in a dark room away from sun light and any male contact. This is done to purify the girl before her marriage to the sun god on the 12th day.  The final day is marked with a bhwe (a traditional party) and celebrations.

Description
The ceremony is conducted before the menarche- generally at the age of 5, 7, 9, 11 or 13 year old.  When the girl is chosen for the ceremony the priest is consulted for a suitable date and place for ceremony. The first day of the ceremony starts with a usual puja conducted either by the eldest woman of the lineage or the priest. The ritual food, Samaybaji which consists of 9 dishes is offered to the sun god. Then the seclusion starts. A voodoo doll representing the bahra Khayak, the cave ghost, is prepared and put at one corner of the room.  It is believed that for the 12 days the girl is possessed in some way by the bahra khayak and thus as homage the girls regularly conducts puja to the khayak. For the first 5 days she is not allowed to clean herself or eat salted food. After the 6th day her female relatives come to visit her with variety of delicacies. Also from this day onward the girls has to put on a special face mask called Kghwao (made of rice flour, roasted fenugreek flour, sandalwood and other herbs) to make her beautiful.

On the 12th day the girls wakes up before the sunrise to take a complete bath. Then she is dressed up in traditional wedding dress with red sari and heavy gold jewelry as if it were an actual wedding.  Finally in an elaborate ritual the priest weds the bride with the sun. The girl is veiled all the time during the ceremony and at the end she lifts her veil and looks at the reflection of the sun on water. The completion of the 12 day ceremony is celebrated with a traditional party. If the girl were to die during this 12 day ritual, the tradition has it that the body should not see the sun. Thus, the body is to be buried underground the same house the girl dies.

Significance 
Bahra ceremony marks the change from a girl to a fertile woman. In the Newar community the girls are married thrice: first to the god vishnu, second to the eternal sun and finally to a man. Even in a case of untimely death of her husband, the woman is never widowed, thus, preventing her from the scrutinizes of the society.

See also 
 Ihi
 Nepal Bhasa
 Newar

References 

Nepalese culture
Marriage in Hinduism
Newar
Indigenous peoples of Nepal